Events from the year 1808 in Russia

Incumbents
 Monarch – Alexander I

Events

 February - Finnish War
 Daniel Steibelt is invited by Tsar Alexander I to Saint Petersburg.
 - Franzfeld

Births

Deaths

References

1808 in Russia
Years of the 19th century in the Russian Empire